The All India Hard Court Championships  also known as the All India Hard Court Tennis Championships was a combined men's and women's clay court tennis tournament founded in 1946. The championships were first played at the Madras Gymkhana Club grounds, Madras, Tamil Nadu, India. The championships ran until 1972 before it was discontinued as part of the worldwide tennis circuit.

History
Tennis was introduced to India in 1880s by British Army and Civilian Officers.  In 1946 the All India Tennis Association established a national level tournament called the All India Hard Court Championships. In 1947, 1955 and 1959 this tournament was held in conjunction with the Western India Championships. The championships were staged until 1972 when they were discontinued as part of the worldwide tennis circuit.

Locations
The championships were staged mainly in Madras, but also throughout India in different locations such as; Amaravati, Bombay, Hyderabad and Trivandrum.

References

Defunct tennis tournaments in India
Clay court tennis tournaments